Wallace Henry Thurman (August 16, 1902 – December 22, 1934) was an American novelist and screenwriter active during the Harlem Renaissance. He also wrote essays, worked as an editor, and was a publisher of short-lived newspapers and literary journals. He is best known for his novel The Blacker the Berry: A Novel of Negro Life (1929), which explores discrimination within the black community based on skin color, with lighter skin being more highly valued.

Early life
Thurman was born in Salt Lake City to Beulah and Oscar Thurman. When Thurman was less than a month old, his father abandoned his wife and son. It was not until Wallace was 30 years old that he met his father. Between his mother's many marriages, Wallace and his mother lived in Salt Lake City with Emma Jackson, his maternal grandmother. Jackson ran a saloon from her home, selling alcohol without a license.

Thurman's early life was marked by loneliness, family instability and illness. He began grade school at age six in Boise, Idaho, but his poor health eventually led to a two-year absence from school, during which he returned to his grandmother Emma in Salt Lake City. From 1910 to 1914, Thurman lived in Chicago. Moving with his mother, he finished grammar school in Omaha, Nebraska. During this time, he suffered from persistent heart attacks. While living in Pasadena, California in the winter of 1918, Thurman caught influenza during the worldwide Influenza Pandemic. He recovered and returned to Salt Lake City, where he finished high school.

Thurman was a voracious reader. He enjoyed the works of Plato, Aristotle, Shakespeare, Havelock Ellis, Flaubert, Charles Baudelaire and many others. He wrote his first novel at the age of 10. He attended the University of Utah from 1919 to 1920 as a pre-medical student. In 1922 he transferred to the University of Southern California in Los Angeles, but left without earning a degree.

While in Los Angeles, he met and befriended the writer Arna Bontemps, and became a reporter and columnist for a black-owned newspaper. He started a magazine, Outlet, intended to be a West Coast equivalent to The Crisis, operated by the NAACP.

Career
In 1925 Thurman moved to Harlem. During the next decade, he worked as a ghostwriter, a publisher, and editor, as well as writing novels, plays, and articles. In 1926, he became the editor of The Messenger, a socialist journal addressed to blacks. There he was the first to publish the adult-themed stories of Langston Hughes. Thurman left the journal in October 1926 to become the editor of World Tomorrow, which was owned by whites. The following month, he collaborated in founding the literary magazine Fire!! Devoted to the Younger Negro Artists. Among its contributors were Hughes, Zora Neale Hurston, Richard Bruce Nugent, Aaron Douglas, and Gwendolyn B. Bennett.

He was able to publish only one issue of Fire!!. It challenged such figures as W. E. B. Du Bois and African Americans who had been working for social equality and racial integration. Thurman criticized them for believing that black art should serve as propaganda for those ends. He said that the New Negro movement spent too much energy trying to show white Americans that blacks were respectable and not inferior.

Thurman and others of the "Niggerati" (the deliberately ironic name he used for the young African American artists and intellectuals of the Harlem Renaissance) wanted to show the real lives of African Americans, both the good and the bad. Thurman believed that black artists should fully acknowledge and celebrate the arduous conditions of African American lives. As Singh and Scott wrote,

Thurman's Harlem Renaissance is, thus, staunch and revolutionary in its commitment to individuality and critical objectivity: the black writer need not pander to the aesthetic preferences of the black middle class, nor should he or she write for an easy and patronizing white approval.

During this time, Thurman's flat in a rooming house, at 267 West 136th Street in Harlem, became the central meeting place of African-American literary avant-garde and visual artists. Thurman and Hurston mockingly called the room "Niggerati Manor." He had painted the walls red and black, which were the colors he used on the cover of Fire!! Nugent painted murals on the walls, some of which contained homoerotic content.

In 1928, Thurman was asked to edit a magazine called Harlem: A Forum of Negro Life; its contributors included Alain Locke, George Schuyler, and Alice Dunbar-Nelson. He put out only two issues.  Afterward, Thurman became a reader for a major New York publishing company, the first African American to work in such a position.

Langston Hughes described Thurman as "...a strangely brilliant black boy, who had read everything and whose critical mind could find something wrong with everything he read." Thurman's dark skin color attracted comment, including negative reactions from both black and white Americans. He used such colorism in his writings, attacking the black community's preference for its lighter-skinned members.

Thurman wrote a play, Harlem, which debuted on Broadway in 1929 to mixed reviews. His theatrical agent was Frieda Fishbein. The same year his first novel The Blacker the Berry: A Novel of Negro Life (1929) was published. The novel is now recognized as a groundbreaking work of fiction because of its focus on intra-racial prejudice and colorism within the black community, where lighter skin has historically been favored.

Three years later Thurman published Infants of the Spring (1932), a satire of the themes and the individuals of the Harlem Renaissance.  He co-authored his final novel, The Interne (1932), with Abraham L. Furman, a white man. 

Thurman worked in the late 1920s as a screenwriter for Fox, MGM, and Pathe studios. His film credits as a screenwriter include Tomorrow's Children and High School Girl, both released in 1934.

Personal life
Shortly after he moved to New York, Thurman was arrested for having sex with a man. He publicly denied being gay and feared that others would discover that he was.

Thurman married Louise Thompson on August 22, 1928. The marriage lasted only six months. Thompson said that Wallace was a homosexual and refused to admit it. They had no children together.

Death
Thurman died at the age of 32 from tuberculosis, which many suspect was exacerbated by his long fight with alcoholism.

See also

Harlem Renaissance
African American literature

Notes

References
Scott, and Daniel M. (2003). The Collected Writings of Wallace Thurman: A Harlem Renaissance Reader.  Rutgers University Press  
Aberjhani and West, Sandra, eds. Encyclopedia of the Harlem Renaissance, "Wallace Thurman", (2003). Checkmark Press 
Rampersad, Arnold (1986). The Life of Langston Hughes Volume 1: I, Too, Sing America. Oxford University Press 
Hughes, Langston. The Big Sea. New York: Hill and Wang, 1994.  (pgs 233 through 238)
Huggins, Nathan Irvin. Harlem Renaissance. New York: Oxford University Press, 1971.

External links
 Detailed biography of Thurman
Wallace Thurman at glbtq
Wallace Thurman Collection. Yale Collection of American Literature, Beinecke Rare Book and Manuscript Library.

1902 births
1934 deaths
20th-century American novelists
African-American screenwriters
American male novelists
American gay writers
LGBT African Americans
Writers from Salt Lake City
American male screenwriters
20th-century deaths from tuberculosis
Tuberculosis deaths in New York (state)
American LGBT novelists
Harlem Renaissance
20th-century American male writers
Novelists from Utah
Screenwriters from Utah
20th-century American screenwriters
Alcohol-related deaths in New York City
African-American novelists
20th-century African-American writers
20th-century American LGBT people
African-American male writers